The 1987 Intercontinental Cup was an association football match played on 13 December 1987 between Porto of Portugal, winners of the 1986–87 European Cup, and Peñarol of Uruguay, winners of the 1987 Copa Libertadores. The match was played at the neutral venue of the National Stadium in Tokyo in front of 45,000 fans. Heavy snow constantly fell during the match and because of this, the pitch was muddy and in bad playing conditions. A moment’s silence was observed before the match. Rabah Madjer was named as man of the match.

Match

Details

|valign="top" width="50%"|

|}

See also
1986–87 European Cup
1987 Copa Libertadores
FC Porto in international football competitions

References

External links
FIFA Article

Intercontinental Cup
Intercontinental Cup
Intercontinental Cup
Intercontinental Cup (football)
Intercontinental Cup 1987
Intercontinental Cup 1987
Intercontinental Cup (football) matches hosted by Japan
Inter
Inter
December 1987 sports events in Asia
Sports competitions in Tokyo
1987 in Tokyo
1987 in association football